The canton of Cluny is an administrative division of the Saône-et-Loire department, eastern France. Its borders were modified at the French canton reorganisation which came into effect in March 2015. Its seat is in Cluny.

It consists of the following communes:
 
Ameugny
Bergesserin
Berzé-le-Châtel
Bissy-sous-Uxelles
Blanot
Bonnay-Saint-Ythaire
Bray
Buffières
Burnand
Burzy
Chapaize
Château
Chérizet
Chevagny-sur-Guye
Chiddes
Chissey-lès-Mâcon
Cluny
Cormatin
Cortambert
Cortevaix
Curtil-sous-Buffières
Curtil-sous-Burnand
Donzy-le-Pertuis
Flagy
La Guiche
Jalogny
Lournand
Malay
Massilly
Mazille
Passy
Pressy-sous-Dondin
Sailly
Saint-André-le-Désert
Saint-Clément-sur-Guye
Sainte-Cécile
Saint-Gengoux-le-National
Saint-Huruge
Saint-Marcelin-de-Cray
Saint-Martin-de-Salencey
Saint-Vincent-des-Prés
Salornay-sur-Guye
Savigny-sur-Grosne
Sigy-le-Châtel
Sivignon
Taizé
Vaux-en-Pré
La Vineuse sur Fregande

References

Cantons of Saône-et-Loire